Bulzeștii de Sus is a commune in Hunedoara County, Transylvania, Romania. It is composed of nine villages: Bulzeștii de Sus, Bulzeștii de Jos (Alsóbulzesd), Giurgești, Grohot (Grohot), Păulești, Rusești, Stănculești, Ticera and Tomnatec (Tomnatek).

Ticera 

Ticera is an abandoned village in the Bulzeștii de Sus commune. The village is currently uninhabited after it has been abandoned by its residents. It was one of the richest villages in the Apuseni mountains. The destruction of the church by lightning, estimated to have happened around 1970, led the residents to leave the village. A road to the village is currently under construction and other than that the village is only reachable by foot through not well-kept footpaths.

References

Communes in Hunedoara County
Localities in Transylvania